Henry Marriott Paget  (18561936) was a British painter and illustrator, who signed his work "HMP".

Paget, along with his brothers, Sidney Paget and Walter Paget, provided illustrations for works by Arthur Conan Doyle.

Work

Newspaper illustration

Illustrated papers like the Illustrated London News often had an artist rework the foreign correspondent's material to produce a drawing from which the engraving could be prepared. This was particularly the case with rough sketches, and initially with photographs. Paget prepared sketches and photographs from the Greco-Turkish War (1897) and the Boer War by war-correspondents for publication. Hodgson notes that almost all the illustrations published by The Sphere during the Boer War were redrawn in London.

Newspaper illustrations turned into paintings

Paget sometimes turned sketches into brush and wash or watercolour paintings, as in some of his work from the Boer War.

Painting

In addition to his work as an illustrator, he was known in England as a painter, executing portraits, street scenes, and scenes from history and Greek mythology.

He contributed a painting to an 1882 book Bedford Park, celebrating the then-fashionable garden suburb of that name.

Book illustration

Kirkpatrick lists over fifty books illustrated by Paget.

Henry Paget provided illustrations for the 1890 edition of Doyle's story, "Micah Clarke," published by Longmans, Green, and Company.

The Black Arrow by Robert Louis Stevenson had first been published as a serial in Young Folks in 1883 and it was a huge success. Cassell & Co. published the story as a book in 1888, and it was such a success that the first printing sold out to the book trade even before it was published. Cassell brought out a new edition with illustrations by Paget in 1891. The illustrations below are from the 1897 edition by Cassell, from scans at the British Library.

References

External links 
 
 
 Henry Marriott Paget at ARt UK
 Works by Paget at the Wellcome Collection.
 detailed biography of H. M. Paget On the Bear Alley blog. This blog was written by Kirkpatrick and is an draft version of the biography in Kirkpatrick's book: 

1856 births
1936 deaths
British illustrators
British children's book illustrators